Idahluy may refer to:
 Idahluy-e Bozorg
 Idahluy-e Kuchek